August Prosenik (25 April 1916 – 22 July 1975) was a Yugoslav amateur road cyclist. He competed in the individual and team events at the 1936 and 1948 Summer Olympics and placed 12th individually in 1936. He won the Tour of Romania in 1946 and the Peace Race in 1948.

Prosenik grew up in a poor family, as his father became disabled after a mining accident. In 1930 he moved to Zagreb and worked there as a workshop mechanic and then as a car mechanic. After retiring from competitions he became a cycling coach and a sports administrator.

References

1916 births
1975 deaths
Yugoslav male cyclists
Olympic cyclists of Yugoslavia
Cyclists at the 1936 Summer Olympics
Cyclists at the 1948 Summer Olympics
People from the Municipality of Brežice